Fox Creek is a stream in the U.S. state of Georgia. It is a tributary to Muckalee Creek.

The Fox Creek most likely comes from the Native Americans of the area, who saw foxes near its course.

References

Rivers of Georgia (U.S. state)
Rivers of Lee County, Georgia
Rivers of Sumter County, Georgia